Chamalychaeus takahashii is a species of tropical land snails  with an operculum, terrestrial gastropod mollusks in the family Cyclophoridae.

This species is endemic to Japan.

References

Molluscs of Japan
Chamalychaeus
Gastropods described in 1976
Taxonomy articles created by Polbot